"1944" is a song written and performed by Ukrainian singer Jamala. It represented Ukraine in the Eurovision Song Contest 2016 and won with a total of 534 points.

A music video for the song was released on 21 September 2016.

Background and lyrics
The lyrics for "1944" concern the deportation of the Crimean Tatars, in the 1940s, by the Soviet Union at the hands of Joseph Stalin because of their alleged collaboration with the Nazis. Jamala was particularly inspired by the story of her great-grandmother Nazylkhan, who was in her mid-20s when she and her five children were deported to Central Asia. One of the daughters did not survive the journey. Jamala's great-grandfather was fighting in World War II in the Red Army at this time and thus could not protect his family. The song was also released amid renewed repression of Crimean Tatars following the Russian annexation of Crimea, since most Crimean Tatars refuse to accept the annexation.

The English lyrics were written by the poet Art Antonyan. The song's chorus, in the Crimean Tatar language, is made up of words from a Crimean Tatar folk song called Ey Güzel Qırım that Jamala had heard from her great-grandmother, reflecting on the loss of a youth which could not be spent in her homeland. The song features the duduk played by Aram Kostanyan and the use of the mugham vocal style.

National selection and Eurovision Song Contest

Ukraine withdrew from the Eurovision Song Contest 2015, citing costs. After deciding to return to the contest in 2016, a selection process to determine the representative of Ukraine was opened, combining resources from the state broadcaster NTU and private STB. Jamala was announced as one of the eighteen competing acts in the Ukrainian national selection for the contest. She performed in the first semi-final on 6 February 2016, where she won both the jury and televote, advancing to the Ukrainian final. In the final, on 21 February, she was placed second by the jury and first by the televote, resulting in a tie with The Hardkiss and their song "Helpless". Jamala was announced as the winner, however, as the televoting acted as a tiebreaker. She received 37.77% of more than 382,000 televotes.

Jamala represented Ukraine in the Eurovision Song Contest 2016, performing in the second half of the second semi-final. "1944" is the first Eurovision song to contain lyrics in the Crimean language. She won the final receiving the second highest televoting score and second highest jury vote.

Accusations of politicisation
In a February 2016 interview with The Guardian, Jamala said that the song also reminded her of her own family living in Crimea nowadays, claiming that since the 2014 Russian annexation of Crimea "the Crimean Tatars are on occupied territory". The song lyrics, however, do not address this annexation. Eurovision rules prohibit songs with lyrics that could be interpreted as having "political content".

Immediately after the selection of this song, some Russian politicians, as well as authorities in Crimea, accused the Ukrainian authorities of  "capitalising on the tragedy of the Tatars to impose on European viewers a false picture of alleged harassment of the Tatars in the Russian Crimea".

On 9 March 2016, a tweet from the European Broadcasting Union confirmed that neither the title nor the lyrics of the song contained "political speech" and therefore it did not breach any Eurovision rule, thus allowing it to remain in the competition.

Eurovision Song Contest
The song won the 2016 Eurovision Song Contest, receiving a grand total of 534 points, officially surpassing the previous record set by Alexander Rybak with his song "Fairytale" in the 2009 Eurovision Song Contest, which won with 387 points.

The national juries voted “Sound of Silence” by Australia first with 320 points, and the televote voted “You Are the Only One” by Russia first with 361 points. The televoting result for Ukraine, of 323 points, however, was sufficient, when added to their jury score of 211 points, to put them in first place, with a grand total of 534 points, leaving Australia second and Russia third.

Critical reception
Prior to the Ukrainian national selection finals, "1944" received 8.33 out of 10 points from a jury of Eurovision blog Wiwibloggs, the highest score among the six finalists in the Ukrainian national selection.

Track listing

Charts

Release history

Notes

References

External links
"1944" - lyrics at eurovision.tv

2015 songs
2016 singles
English-language Ukrainian songs
Eurovision Song Contest winning songs
Eurovision songs of 2016
Eurovision songs of Ukraine
Songs about World War II
Songs about Crimea
Jamala songs
Crimean Tatar music
Crimean Tatar-language songs